Family Kingdom Amusement Park is a seaside amusement park in Myrtle Beach, South Carolina. Located on Ocean Boulevard in Myrtle Beach, the amusement park has 37 rides for adults and children of all ages, including thrill rides, family rides, kiddie rides and go karts. In 2008 TripAdvisor ranked it at number five on its list of the top 10 amusement parks outside Orlando.

In business for more than 40 years, the park has the 2,400 foot, figure eight Swamp Fox wooden roller coaster, which is one of roughly one hundred wooden roller coasters still operating in North America  and ranked number 10 on About.com's list of the top 10 most underrated roller coasters in North America. In 2016, American Coaster Enthusiasts marked the 50th anniversary of the Swamp Fox by adding a historical marker. The Swamp Fox was also declared a historic structure by the city in March 2017.

Other signature rides include O.D. Hopkins Log Flume, Great Pistolero Round-up and the Giant Wheel.

Family Kingdom's "Giant Wheel" Ferris wheel has round open gondolas that give a 100-foot-high view of Myrtle Beach and the Atlantic Ocean. For 19 years, until 2011, it reigned as the highest Ferris wheel in the state

There is no admission price to enter the open park. Ride tickets can be purchased independently. Wristbands that entitle patrons to ride all day are available. The park provides free entertainment such as clowns, magicians, jugglers, stilt walkers, face painters and balloon sculptors. Family Kingdom Amusement Park is located on both banks of historic Withers Swash. The swash is a point where a natural stream meets the beach and ocean, and through which tides flow. Much of the surrounding area was part of a 66,000-acre king's grant to Robert Francis Withers in the early 1700s, who operated it as an indigo plantation overlooking the swash.

Family Kingdom Amusement Park is approximately 13 acres.

History
Family Kingdom Amusement Park opened as Grand Strand Amusement Park in 1966. The park was purchased by the Ammons family in 1992 and renamed “Family Kingdom Amusement Park”.

Country music star Kenny Chesney shot part of his "Anything but Mine" music video at Family Kingdom in 2005.

Splashes Oceanfront Water Park

Splashes Oceanfront Water Park, originally known as Wild Rapids, is a water park attraction in Myrtle Beach, South Carolina. A two-acre facility with 500 feet of Atlantic Ocean frontage, it is located across Ocean Boulevard from Family Kingdom Amusement Park.

The park's attractions include a lazy river with waterfalls, water flumes, and eight kiddie slides. In 2007, TripAdvisor named Family Kingdom and Splashes number five on its list of the top 10 amusement parks outside Orlando.

The park is located at 300 South Ocean Boulevard. It has 18 attractions, including two enclosed body waterslides, two speed slides, two open flume slides, and an enclosed flume slide; a children's area that includes splash pools, eight kiddie slides, two rain trees, and a play pool with a multi-tiered waterfall.

History
The park first opened under the name "Wild Rapids" in 1977.  In 1997, Family Kingdom Amusement Park purchased the water park, expanded the water attractions, and renamed it "Family Kingdom Water Park".  In 2013, the water park was renamed "Splashes Oceanfront Water Park".

Current rides

Roller coasters

Family Kingdom features three different roller coasters. The oldest is Swamp Fox.

Other rides

Children’s rides

References

External links
 Family Kingdom official website
 Family Kingdom – Splashes Oceanfront Water Park official website

 

Amusement parks in South Carolina
Buildings and structures in Myrtle Beach, South Carolina
Tourist attractions in Myrtle Beach, South Carolina
1966 establishments in South Carolina
Water parks in South Carolina